The Shakey River is a  river on the Upper Peninsula of Michigan which flows into the Menominee River, a tributary of Lake Michigan.

See also
List of rivers of Michigan

References

Michigan  Streamflow Data from the USGS

Rivers of Michigan
Tributaries of Lake Michigan